Mystery Land can refer to any of the following:
Mysteryland, a series of electronic dance music festivals held by the Netherlands-based promoter ID&T
Mystery Land (EP), by Y-Traxx
"Mystery Land" (song), title track featuring Neve
"Mysteryland" (song), by Die Ärzte